Ideal Scene is an album by the American jazz saxophonist Lee Konitz and his Quartet recorded in 1986, and released on the Italian Soul Note label.

Critical reception
The AllMusic review by Scott Yanow states, "The subtle but swinging music is harmonically advanced and full of surprising twists; no predictable bebop here. More than most members of his musical generation, Lee Konitz has continued to keep his music and improvising style fresh and enthusiastic while retaining his own original musical personality through the years".

Track listing
 "Chick Came Around" (Lee Konitz) – 6:13
 "Tidal Breeze" (Harold Danko) – 7:50 
 "Silly Samba " (Harold Danko) – 6:30 
 "Ezz-Thetic" (George Russell) – 4:35 
 "If You Could See Me Now" (Tadd Dameron) – 7:30 
 "Stare-Case" (Harold Danko) – 3:06 
 "Stella by Starlight" (Victor Young, Ned Washington) – 9:24 
Recorded July 22 and 23, 1986; mixed July 28, 1986 at Barigozzi Studio, Milano.

Personnel
Lee Konitz – alto saxophone, Liner Notes
Harold Danko – piano
Rufus Reid – bass
Al Harewood – drums

References

Black Saint/Soul Note albums
Lee Konitz albums
1986 albums